Gerardus Johannes "Hans" Wijers (born 11 January 1951) is a Dutch retired politician of the Democrats 66 (D66) party, and businessman. He is the chairman of the supervisory board of ING Group since 2018.

Early life
After secondary school at Hogere Burgerschool (HBS-B) level, Wijers studied Economics at the University of Groningen, where he graduated cum laude in 1976. As assistant professor, he taught Economics at the Erasmus University, and in 1982 received a doctorate for his research in "Industrial politics: the design of governmental policy for industrial sectors".

Civil service
From 1982 till 1984, Wijers worked as a civil servant at the ministry of Social Affairs and Labour and later at the ministry of Economic Affairs. Subsequently, he became a management consultant at, amongst others, Horringa & De Koning, which later became part of Boston Consulting Group.

Politics
Wijers, a member of D66 since 1976, was asked in 1994 by his party colleague Hans van Mierlo to take up a ministerial post in the First Kok cabinet. As Minister of Economic Affairs he was responsible for the law change regarding the extending of shop opening hours, and he formulated the Competition Regulation law which triggered the foundation of the Dutch Competition Authority. An important event in his ministry was the bankruptcy of the Fokker aircraft factory in March 1996. When Wijers refused further state aid due to a lack of a clear future perspective, German company DASA withdrew as parent company.

By the end of the cabinet period, Hans van Mierlo had decided not to stand for re-election. The party leaders exercised strong pressure on the popular Wijers to take on the party leadership. When the second purple cabinet was formed after the election in 1998, Wijers expressed that he had no interest in a second term as minister.

Life after politics
In 1999 Wijers picked up his old career as a consultant: he became senior partner and chairman of the Dutch branch of the consulting firm The Boston Consulting Group. In July 2002 he became a member of the Board of Directors of Akzo Nobel NV and on 1 May 2003 he became Chairman of the Board of Directors. He succeeded Kees van Lede. Under his leadership the pharmacy branch of Organon, (Organon BioSciences), was sold in 2007 and the British ICI was acquired. AkzoNobel focused more to paint and chemistry. At the end of April 2012 he decided to resign as chairman of the board. He was succeeded by Ton Büchner.

Wijers has been non-executive director at Royal Dutch Shell since January 2009; he later became vice-chairman. He is President of Heineken and supervisory director at HAL Holding NV. He is also chairman of the Vereniging Natuurmonumenten and Chairman of the Supervisory Board of the Royal Concertgebouw NV. In 2010 he was chairman of the jury of the Libris Literature Prize. In 2013 he was chairman of the National Committee inauguration for King Willem-Alexander of the Netherlands.

From 2021 to 2022, Wijers was a member of the Trilateral Commission’s Task Force on Global Capitalism in Transition, chaired by Carl Bildt, Kelly Grier and Takeshi Niinami.

Personal
Wijers lives with his partner, and has two children.

Decorations

References

External links

Official
  Dr. G.J. (Hans) Wijers Parlement & Politiek

 
 

 

 

 

 

 

 

 

 

 

 

 

1951 births
Living people
Boston Consulting Group people
Democrats 66 politicians
Directors of Shell plc
Dutch academic administrators
Dutch chief executives in the finance industry
Dutch chief executives in the food industry
Dutch chief executives in the manufacturing industry
Dutch corporate directors
Dutch expatriates in the United States
Dutch management consultants
Dutch nonprofit directors
Dutch nonprofit executives
Dutch sports executives and administrators
Erasmus University Rotterdam alumni
Academic staff of Erasmus University Rotterdam
Heineken people
Ministers of Economic Affairs of the Netherlands
Ministers of Finance of the Netherlands
Officers of the Order of Orange-Nassau
Politicians from Amsterdam
People from Sluis
People from Veere
University of Groningen alumni
Academic staff of the University of Groningen
20th-century Dutch businesspeople
20th-century Dutch civil servants
20th-century Dutch economists
20th-century Dutch educators
20th-century Dutch politicians
21st-century Dutch businesspeople
21st-century Dutch economists
21st-century Dutch educators
21st-century Dutch politicians
Businesspeople from Amsterdam